Sweet Frog (stylized as sweetFrog - Premium Frozen Yogurt) is a chain of frozen yogurt retail restaurants owned and operated by Sweet Frog Enterprises, LLC. Sweet Frog customers create their own soft-serve frozen yogurt with numerous flavors and toppings from which to choose. Derek Cha, who immigrated to the United States from South Korea at the age of 12, is the founder of Sweet Frog.  He opened the first Sweet Frog shop in Richmond, Virginia in 2009, at a time when the United States economy was in a recession. Cha founded Sweet Frog on Christian principles. The "FROG" part of the name, according to Cha, is actually an acronym for "Fully Rely on God".

The Sweet Frog restaurant's interiors are painted pink and green, and the typical store consists of seven or eight frozen yogurt machines, toppings bars, and merchandise, much of which is centered on Sweet Frog's mascots "Scoop" and "Cookie."

In the Fall of 2018, SweetFrog was acquired  by a wholly owned subsidiary of Canada-based MTY Food Group Inc. of Montreal, Quebec. Based in Scottsdale, Arizona, at the time of its acquisition by MTY Food Group, the chain operated 332 locations in the United States and abroad, most of which are franchised.

Growth
Derek Cha started Sweet Frog with only one restaurant in 2009, and in four years Sweet Frog had grown to over 215 stores in 25 states in the U.S., with more stores located internationally in the Dominican Republic, the United Kingdom, and Egypt.  In its first 3 years of franchising, over 60 Sweet Frog stores were opened. By the spring of 2012, it was reported that Sweet Frog had 100 stores, and expected to have 200 by the end of the calendar year  Cha's goal was to have 200 Sweet Frog stores by the end of 2012.  A 24 April 2013 article reported that Sweet Frog had 240 stores at the time of that writing, which would include corporate-owned, licensed and franchised locations.  It added that Sweet Frog had grown from 130 stores only seven months earlier in October 2012. By 2020, Cha stated that he would like to have 1,000 U. S. locations and 1,000 international locations

On April 17, 2012, Boxwood Capital Partners, LLC announced that it had made a growth capital investment in sweetFrog Enterprises, LLC.  Boxwood's minority investment is being used to help fund Sweet Frog's expansion plans across the country and internationally. Subsequent to the investment, James Patrick Galleher, the Managing Director at Boxwood Capital Partners became the Chief Executive Officer of Sweet Frog Enterprises, LLC.

In 2014, sweetFrog was listed #22 on the Inc. 500 list of fastest growing private companies in 2014 with revenues of $34.4 million.

On February 2, 2015, it was announced that Boxwood Capital Partners, LLC had acquired sweetFrog Enterprises, LLC.

The table below shows the Year (column 1), how many stores Sweet Frog opened during that year (column 2) and the total number of stores that Sweet Frog had open and was operating by the end of that calendar year (column 3):

Sponsorships 
On April 18, 2016, it was announced by BK Racing that sweetFrog would be sponsoring David Ragan and the No. 23 Toyota Camry for the Toyota Owners 400 at Richmond International Raceway. sweetFrog returned to sponsor Ragan's No. 23 for the Federated Auto Parts 400 at Richmond in August. sweetFrog later appeared in the video game NASCAR Heat Evolution.

See also
 List of frozen yogurt companies

References

External links
 Official website

2009 establishments in Virginia
Companies based in Richmond, Virginia
Frozen yogurt businesses
Regional restaurant chains in the United States
Restaurants established in 2009
Fast-food franchises
Fast-food chains of the United States